Ridgewood Park is an unincorporated community in Mendocino County, California. It lies at an elevation of 2178 feet (664 m).

References

Unincorporated communities in California
Unincorporated communities in Mendocino County, California